The Warlocks Motorcycle Club (also sometimes distinguished as the Harpy Warlocks or Philly Warlocks) is a one-percenter outlaw motorcycle club that was formed in Philadelphia, Pennsylvania in 1965. It was the first official 1% outlaw motorcycle club founded in Pennsylvania. The club is most prominent in and has significant territory in the Delaware Valley, including Philadelphia, Delaware County, South Jersey, and Wilmington, though they also have a heavy presence in the nearby Lehigh Valley. There are now chapters all throughout Pennsylvania, South Jersey, and Delaware, as well as Ohio. The club's insignia is a Harpy, which in Greek and Roman mythology, was a female monster in the form of a bird with a human face. Their colors are Red and White. The club rapidly expanded at the end of the Vietnam War when thousands of soldiers returned home to the United States, many to Pennsylvania.

Criminal activities
In December 1988, individuals associated with the Warlocks kidnapped the then Breed chapter president Craig "Coyote" Gudkneckt in retaliation for several Warlock members being jumped by Breed members in a Bensalem bar. Gudkneckt was taken to the home of a Warlock where he was tied up, beaten and pistol-whipped. Gudkneckt escaped.

On May 6, 1995 Police Sgt. Ippolito "Lee" Gonzalez of Franklin Township, Gloucester County, New Jersey pulled over Warlocks members Robert "Mudman" Simon and Charles "Shovel" Staples on a traffic stop moments after the two had committed a commercial burglary. Simon shot Gonzalez twice, in the head and neck, and Gonzalez died instantly. Simon later said he shot Sergeant Gonzalez because he did not want to return to prison. Simon was quickly apprehended, pleaded guilty, and was sentenced to death. At the time of Gonzalez's murder Simon was barely three months out of jail and on parole after a 1981 conviction for killing a woman in Carbon County, Pennsylvania.  In 1999, Simon was stomped to death by Ambrose Harris, another death-row inmate, in New Jersey's Trenton State Prison. Harris argued self-defense, and was acquitted.

Police seized six rifles, ten handguns and various illegal drugs.

In October 2008, Pennsylvania State Attorney General Tom Corbett alleged that the Warlocks motorcycle club is involved with a methamphetamine manufacturing operation based in Berks County Pennsylvania. The sting was dubbed "Operation Underground". Corbett said the operation manufactured and distributed $9 million worth of methamphetamine throughout southeastern Pennsylvania and possibly (supplied) to members of the Warlocks motorcycle club, which has allegedly been linked to organized crime and drug trafficking. "The Warlocks have been the subject of other investigations, and we will continue to investigate the Warlock-Spadafora meth connection," Corbett said. He added that the investigation is continuing and he expects more arrests. There were no Warlocks arrested or charged at the time of this press release.

References

External links/sources
 The Original Warlocks MC
 Text from New Jersey State Commission of Investigation report on outlaw motorcycle gangs, as posted on New Jersey Mafia website
 Warlocks v. Warlocks

1965 establishments in Pennsylvania
Outlaw motorcycle clubs
Gangs in Pennsylvania
Gangs in Philadelphia
Gangs in New Jersey
Motorcycle clubs in the United States